Each winner of the 1974 Governor General's Awards for Literary Merit was selected by a panel of judges administered by the Canada Council for the Arts.

Winners

English Language
Fiction: Margaret Laurence, The Diviners.
Poetry or Drama: Ralph Gustafson, Fire on Stone.
Non-Fiction: Charles Ritchie, The Siren Years.

French Language
Fiction: Victor-Lévy Beaulieu, Don Quichotte de la démanche.
Poetry or Drama: Nicole Brossard, Mécanique jongleuse suivi de Masculin grammaticale.
Non-Fiction: Louise Dechêne, Habitants et marchands de Montréal au XVIIe siècle.

Governor General's Awards
Governor General's Awards
Governor General's Awards